Orbital: Live at Glastonbury 1994–2004 is a collection of rare live recordings containing over two hours of music and video recorded from Orbital's performances at the Glastonbury Festival over a decade.

The DVD has the same track listing as the two CDs (16:9 NTSC video, uncompressed LPCM audio). It offers chapter stops, but has no chapter menu.

Track listing

CD 1
 "Walk Now" (1994)
 "Are We Here?" (1994)
 "Attached" (1994)
 "Kein Trink Wasser" (1995)
 "Impact (The Earth Is Burning)" (1995)
 "Remind" (1995)
 "Halcyon" (1999)
 "The Box" (1999)

CD 2
 "Style" / "Bagpipe Style" (1999)
 "The Girl with the Sun in Her Head" (2002)
 "Funny Break (Weekend Ravers)" (2002)
 "Belfast" (2002)
 "Frenetic" (2002)
 "Satan" (2004)
 "Dr. Who?" (2004)
 "Chime" (2004)

DVD
 "Walk Now" (1994)
 "Are We Here?" (1994)
 "Attached" (1994)
 "Kein Trink Wasser" (1995)
 "Impact (The Earth Is Burning)" (1995)
 "Remind" (1995)
 "Halcyon" (1999)
 "The Box" (1999)
 "Style / Bagpipe Style" (1999)
 "The Girl with the Sun in Her Head" (2002)
 "Funny Break (Weekend Ravers)" (2002)
 "Belfast" (2002)
 "Frenetic" (2002)
 "Satan" (2004)
 "Dr Who?" (2004)
 "Chime" (2004)

References

External links
 
 loopz.co.uk - Official Orbital Web Site

Orbital (band) albums
2007 live albums